John Heslin (born 27 June 1992) is a Gaelic footballer who plays for the Westmeath county team and Australian rules footballer for the Irish Warriors. Heslin was drafted by Australian Football League club Richmond in 2011, with Pick #90 of the Rookie Draft, but left after just three months, without playing a single game.

Playing career

Gaelic football
The St Loman's clubman represented University College Dublin in the Sigerson Cup and Westmeath at all levels and starred as Westmeath reached the Leinster Under-21 Football Championship final. He also played in two games of the 2011 All-Ireland Senior Football Championship and went on to become a permanent fixture in the Westmeath team.

He was a playing member of the team when Westmeath won the 2019 National Football League Division 3 league title by a goal against Laois at Croke Park.

In the 2022 Tailteann Cup Final he overtook Dessie Dolan as Westmeath's all-time championship top scorer.

Australian football
Heslin represented the Ireland national Australian rules football team, that won the 2011 Australian Football International Cup and kicked four goals in the tournament.

Richmond Football Club
Heslin joined the Tigers as a rookie in the 2012 Pre-season Draft. After only three months on the Tigers' rookie list, homesickness proved too much for the St Loman's clubman, and he resumed his inter-county career with Westmeath.

Honours
Westmeath
 Tailteann Cup (1): 2022
 National Football League Division 3 (1): 2019

Individual
 Tailteann Cup Team of the Year (1): 2022

References

1992 births
Living people
Alumni of University College Dublin
Gaelic footballers who switched code
Irish expatriate sportspeople in Australia
Irish players of Australian rules football
St Loman's Gaelic footballers
Westmeath inter-county Gaelic footballers